Hiddensee is a car-free island in the Baltic Sea, located west of Germany's largest island, Rügen, on the German coast.

The island has about 1,000 inhabitants. It was a holiday destination for East German tourists during German Democratic Republic (GDR) times, and continues to attract tourists today. It is the location of the University of Greifswald's ornithological station. Gerhart Hauptmann and Walter Felsenstein are buried there.

Name 

The name Hedinsey surfaces as early as the Prose Edda and the Gesta Danorum written by Saxo Grammaticus and means "Island of Hedin". The legendary Norwegian king, Hedin, was supposed to have fought here for a woman or even just for gold. Under Danish rule the name Hedins-Oe ("Hedin's Island") was common. Even in 1880 the island was shown in German maps as Hiddensjö and, in 1929, in German holiday guides as Hiddensöe. Its full Germanization to Hiddensee is thus relatively recent.

Geography 

It is the largest island within the Western Pomerania Lagoon Area National Park and belongs to the district of Vorpommern-Rügen in the state of Mecklenburg-Western Pomerania. It lies west of the island of Rügen and is divided into an undulating, over  northern part (Dornbusch, whose highest point is the Bakenberg at ), a dune and heath landscape in the central area (Dünenheide) and a flat, only few-metres-high southern part, the Gellen. In the northeast are the two  spits of Alter Bessin and Neuer Bessin. The island is bounded by the  Schaproder Bodden and Vitter Bodden to the east, the Gellenstrom (the shipping channel to Stralsund) to the south and the open Baltic Sea to the west and north.

Geology 

The island of Hiddensee is, from a geological perspective, a very young landscape and was formed during the last  ice age about 12,000 years ago. The ice age left behind here a Young Drift landscape. As a result of thawing inland ice, the underlying land rose and the hollows filled with water; the predecessor of what became the Baltic Sea, Ancylus Lake emerged. As a result, only protruding ridges like the Dornbusch remained visible, as islands. The overall shape of the coast in the southern area of the Baltic Sea was formed during the Littorina Transgression about 7,000 to 2,500 years ago. Around 5,000 years ago, the sea level attained its present level and the Dornbusch and two older island cores became islands. 4,500 years ago the salt water currents from the North Sea were sharply reduced. The Baltic has slowly become less salty since. As a result of coastal erosion (land denudation, drift and deposition) the islands changed to their present shapes over the course of time. For example, the former three island cores were joined to one another by accretion. This process still carried sand away from the north of the Dornbusch. In 2000,  of till twice broke off from the northern tip of the Hiddensee in the area of the Toter Kerl and collapsed into the sea. In mid-March 2004 another  collapsed into the sea. Geologically seen the Hiddensee is a region undergoing constant change. The landmasses carried away from its northern tip are washed up again at the southern end and on the east side of the Schaproder Bodden. This has caused the formation of two geologically recent spits at the southern end of the  Gellen: the Alter Bessin und Neuer Bessin. Since then it has barely grown. Meanwhile, a third Bessin is emerging. Even the southern tip is growing as a so-called windwatt into the Schaproder Bodden.

Climate 

Hiddensee is dominated macro-climatically by the Baltic Sea coastal climate with frequent alternation between maritime and continental influences. Characteristically it has frequent, brisk and changeable winds and long periods of sunshine. This averages 1,850 hours per year. As a result, Hiddensee is one of the sunniest places in Germany. One special feature is so-called transperiod wind circulation, when there are weak, offshore wind conditions, and which is caused by the different temperatures over the sea and land. This produces a sea breeze in late morning that abates in the afternoon or evening.

In 2008, Hiddensee-Dornbusch was the sunniest place in Germany, as reported by the weather service, Meteomedia, with 2,168 hours of sunshine. The data was gathered by Meteomedia's own weather station.

Flora and Fauna 

Hiddensee is the largest island in the Western Pomerania Lagoon Area National Park and blends an old cultural landscape with the wood pastures of the original dune heathland. The large accumulations of new land in the northeast (Alter and Neuer Bessin) and south (at the Gellen) of Hiddensee offer habitats for numerous invertebrates, such as worms and mussels. These in turn provide nourishment for many migrating birds. For example, the area around the island is one of the most important  crane roosting areas in Germany. The southern tip of the island is, like the Neuer Bessin was therefore classified as conservation zone I of the national park und is out-of-bounds.

The Naturschutzgesellschaft Hiddensee und Boddenlandschaft maintains a national park house in Vitte, with a permanent exhibition of fauna and flora.

Subdivisions 
The municipality of Insel Hiddensee ("Island of Hiddensee") has four subdivisions (from north to south):

Grieben 
Grieben is the oldest, northernmost and smallest village on Hiddensee and lies on the eastern edge of the uplands of the island. Its name comes from the Slavic grib (for "mushroom"). Grieben has no harbour of its own.

Kloster 

The parish of  Kloster gets its name from the former Cistercian abbey, which stood from 1296 to 1536 in the vicinity of the present harbour in Kloster. It was dissolved with the Reformation. Today Kloster with its Gerhart Hauptmann Haus, the island church and island cemetery with the graves of Gerhart Hauptmann, Walter Felsenstein and Gret Palucca is the cultural centre of Hiddensee. It lies on the edge of the uplands (Hochland), whose highest point is the Dornbusch. In Kloster are the Hiddensee Biological Station and the Hiddensee Bird Observatory, both branches of the  University of Greifswald, which were both formed out of the Hiddensee Biological Research Institute, founded in 1930.

Vitte 

Vitte (pronounced: Fitte), first mentioned in 1513, is the main settlement and the largest and most central village on the island. The name is a derivation of vit; a word that was used to refer to places where fish was sold. In Vitte is the parish hall and council administration. In addition there is the ferry landing stage for the goods ferry that brings delivery and waste disposal vehicles from Schaprode on the island of Rügen. Goods are transferred to trailers that are pulled by electric tractors and distributed to the food markets and restaurants on the island. Sometimes smaller goods are still delivered by horse and cart. The heath landscape on Hiddensee, between Vitte and Neuendorf, is also part of Vitte. In Vitte is the oldest surviving house on the island, the Witch's House, the old summer house for Adolf Reichwein. In addition there is the last tented cinema and the puppet theatre .

Neuendorf 

Neuendorf is the southernmost settlement on Hiddensee. The inhabitants of Neuendorf are known by the rest of the island as the Southerners. Although Neuendorf is only  from Vitte, its inhabitants speak a different dialect. Large parts of Neuendorf resemble a large pasture on which the houses are arranged like a piece of string. There are no paths in places, so that some addresses may only be reached by walking over the grass. Neuendorf has its own harbour.

Neuendorf consists of two originally independent villages: the older one, Plogshagen, existed as early as the 13th century and the actual Neuendorf, which was formed in 1700 by relocation of people from Glambek. Ruins of these settlements are still recognisable today northeast of Neuendorf parish.

South of Neuendorf lies the so-called Gellen, an important bird reserve that belongs to conservation zone I of the West Pomeranian Lagoon Area National Park and is thus out-of-bounds to the public.

History

To 1800 
The first settlement of the island took place in the Middle and New Stone Age. After the Germanic population had left the southern Baltic region in the 6th century AD, the Rani (a Slavic tribe) took possession of the island. In 1168, King Valdemar I of Denmark defeated the Rani, conquered the fortress of Jaromarsburg on Arkona, brought them under Danish feudal dependency and introduced Christianity. Hiddensee was therefore under Danish rule. On 13 April 1296, the Hiddensee "as the salt seas flows around it" was presented by the Prince of Rügen, Vitslav II to Neuenkamp Abbey. Here a Cistercian abbey was founded, called Nikolaikamp ("St. Nicholas' Kamp"), named after St. Nicholas, the patron saint of sailors. In fact, the monastery was called Hiddensee Abbey (Kloster Hiddensee) for the entire time of its existence. Concurrent with the construction of the monastery, from 1302 to 1306, the Gellen church was built in the south of the island, a small beacon, the Luchte, and the first harbour. The foundations of these buildings are located west of the Gellen today in the Baltic Sea.

In 1332, the island church, which is still there today, was consecrated in the current parish of Kloster, outside the abbey walls, especially for the farmers and fishermen on the island. On the transfer of the font from the Gellen church to the new church, pastoral duties were henceforth carried out from there. The barrel vault, built around 1781, was painted with a rose pattern in 1922 by Berlin artist, Nicholas Niemeier.

The abbey was dissolved in 1536 in the wake of the Reformation. During the Thirty Years' War from 1618 to 1648 the mixed oak forest on the Dornbusch was burned down on the orders of Wallenstein in 1628. The aim was to prevent the Danes using the island as a source of wood for their ships. Even today the layer of ash can be seen, a few centimetres under the grass sward, on the edges of the footpaths near the lighthouse ändern. In the years from 1648 to 1815 the Hiddensee, like the rest of West Pomerania, found itself under Swedish rule.

1801 to 1944 

From 1815 Hiddensee and West Pomerania belonged to Prussia until the end of the Second World War, and was part of the  county of Landkreis Rügen (Kreis Rügen to 1939). In 1835 the Stralsund abbey, Kloster zum Heiligen Geist bought the island and, in 1837 and 1840 the first schools on the island were built in Plogshagen and Kloster. In the years between 1854 and 1864, as part of the abolition of serfdom, the real estate on the Hiddensee was reallocated. During this period, from 1861, the reforestation of the Dornbusch began.

In each of the years 1872 and 1873 the island was hit by severe storm floods. The first broke Hiddensee in two when the entire centre section of the island was flooded, something which could only be reversed by extensive building measures. After the second storm flood the famous Hiddensee treasure (a Viking work from the 10th century) was supposed to have been found. A replica of it can be seen today in the Hiddensee Local History Museum; the original is kept in the Stralsund Museum of Cultural History.

In 1874, the district of Hiddensee was formed. In 1888, the lighthouse was built in Kloster and lifeboat station completed. In 1892 the first time regular steamer plied between Stralsund and Kloster. In 1905, with the founding of the medical administrative union, the first doctor on Hiddensee was appointed. In 1927, the island was connected to the electrical network. Three years later, the Biological Research Station was established, from which, in 1936, a bird observatory was formed, the Hiddensee Biological Research Station. Between 1937 and 1939, the three parishes on the island were merged into the municipality of Hiddensee.

In the 1920s, Hiddensee was an artists' colony that included Erich Heckel, Käthe Kollwitz, Carl Zuckmayer, Lion Feuchtwanger, Georg Grosz among others. Also Thomas Mann, Albert Einstein, Sigmund Freud and Franz Kafka spent their holidays on Hiddensee in the 1920s.
Opera soprano Lotte Lehmann spoke very fondly of vacationing at Hiddennsee in her autobiography.

1945 to 1989 

In 1945, Hiddensee was liberated on 4 and 5 May by Soviet troops. The same and the following year, as part of the land reform in the Soviet zone of occupation, Hiddensee was split into 18 "new farmer" plots. In 1952, the ferry service between Seehof on Rügen and Fährinsel ceased. In the years 1952–1955 the island belonged to the County of Bergen.

In 1953, during , several hoteliers fled to the West and others were arrested. After this action, all hotels on the island were taken over by the Free German Trade Union Federation (FDGB). In the fifties, the museum and the Gerhart Hauptmann House were opened, and the Dornbusch Agricultural Production Cooperative (LPG) was founded. In 1962, the building of the dyke between Kloster and Vitte began. The cooperative shipping company was taken over by the Weiße Flotte and the fishermen integrated into the Fishery Production Cooperative of Marine and Coastal Fishermen De Süder branch in Neuendorf and Swantevit branch in Vitte.

On 10 April 1967, as a result of marine seismic investigations in the north of the island of Hiddensee, the "E Rügen 2/67"  exploratory well began a period of oil exploration. The  exploratory well, like the following boreholes drilled up to December 1968 ("E Hiddensee 3/67, 4/68 and 5/68") found no usable oil reserves. As a result, the already prepared 5th borehole was cancelled and all holes were refilled in the summer of 1971.

Hiddensee was considered a niche for dissidents and dropouts who worked in the summer, often in hotels, restaurants, or as lifeguards. On the small island they were easily controlled, and despite sometimes open Stasi observation, many meetings and incidents were allowed. On 7 May 1989, in the GDR local elections there were 4.7% dissenting votes.

An urban legend during the GDR said that in order to escape the hardships of communist rule, the workers and farmers of Hiddensee wrote a letter to Joseph Stalin requesting to be annexed by Sweden (Hiddensee belonged to Swedish Pomerania 1648–1815). The legend reflects the humour typical of people in the GDR.

1989 to the present 
In 1992 the research establishments of the Schwedenhagen Research Station of the Berlin Central Institute of Electrophysics and the Fährinsel Research Station of the Jena Central Institute of  Microbiology and experimental Therapy were closed. In  1996, the island won its municipal independence, but they lost it again in 2005 in the course of the municipal reform in Mecklenburg-Western Pomerania. Since then it has belonged to the subdistrict of Amt West-Rügen.

Until 1990 the parish belonged to the county of Rügen in the province of Rostock and was in the same year part of the state of Mecklenburg-Western Pomerania.

Storm floods 
Time and again Hiddensee has been struck by storm floods. For example, in the year 1304 the island is supposed to have been separated from the island of Rügen by the All Saints flood. But this is disputed. Between 1864 and 1865 the island was breached three times by storm floods between Hoher Dünschen Garn and Peterbergscher Garn, a very low-lying and narrow point. Hiddensee was again flooded near Plogshagen by the 1872 Baltic Sea flood on 12 and 13 November 1872.  Even today, the island threatens to divide into a southern and a northern part, something which can only be avoided by extensive coastal defence measures.

Transport 

Private motor vehicles are banned throughout the entire island. For public services and agricultural purposes only a few motorized vehicles are permitted. As a result, the island is virtually car-free. Some of the permitted vehicles are equipped with electric propulsion.
The majority of the public transport and part of the goods traffic is provided using horse-drawn carriages. A public bus service operated by the Rügener Personennahverkehr (RPNV) runs between the villages of Grieben, Kloster, Vitte and Neuendorf. The island may be reached from Stralsund as well as Schaprode on Rügen with passenger ferries of the Reederei Hiddensee, which call at Kloster, Vitte and Neuendorf. In the summer season there are additional services to Ralswiek, Breege, Wiek and Zingst. In addition, there are water taxi links with the mainland and the island of Rügen.

Sights and museums

Kloster 

Dornbusch Lighthouse

In the north of the island, on the Schluckswiek in the so-called Hochland ("highlands") of Hiddensee, stands the symbol of the island, the Hiddensee Lighthouse. 102 steps climb the tower that has been open to the public since 1994. So that it does not become too crowded at the top, only 15 visitors may climb the tower at a time. From wind strength 6 the tower is closed for safety reasons.

Gerhart Hauptmann House

In 1930 Gerhart Hauptmann bought the former  on Hiddensee. Today it houses a museum and is a venue for cultural events.

Hiddensee Island Church

The Hiddensee Island Church (Inselkirche Hiddensee) in Kloster is part of an old monastery. It was consecrated in 1332 and served for centuries as the parish church for the island's inhabitants. Today the island church is the seat of the Evangelical parish of Hiddensee.

 Lietzenburg

The Lietzenburg is an Art Nouveau villa, which the artist  had built in the years 1904/1905. It is a brick building with a natural stone base on a hill near the Dornbusch.

Hiddensee Local History Museum

The Hiddensee Local History Museum (Heimatmuseum Hiddensee) is a modest plastered building in Kloster. It has a permanent exhibition about the island's history with about 450 exhibits, documents, about 2,500 photographs, postcards and slides as well as a comprehensive library. Several works of well known representatives of the artists' colony on Hiddensee are also in the museum's collection.

Vitte 
Hiddensee National Park House

The Hiddensee National Park House (Nationalparkhaus Hiddensee) was opened in 1998. The house, located in the north of Vitte, is a thatched building with a trapezoidal ground plan. It contains a permanent exhibition about the West Pomeranian Lagoon Area National Park with special emphasis on Hiddensee. The exhibition goes under the slogan Panta Rhei – Alles fließt.

Asta Nielsen House

The round building, named after the Danish word for carousel, is also called Karusel, and was occupied by Asta Nielsen.

Blaue Scheune

The Blaue Scheune was originally a Low German hall house from the early 19th century. It currently houses an art gallery with works that belonged to the painter Günter Fink (1913-2000).

Henni Lehmann House

The Landhaus Lehmann was used from 1907 to 1937 as a summer residence for the family of Henni Lehmann. It was designed by Schwerin architect, .

After that it was modified and was used until 1991 as the village hall of Vitte. Since 5 June 2000 the house has been officially named the  Henni-Lehmann-Haus and is used for events and exhibitions as well as the local library.

Neuendorf 
Leuchtfeuer Gellen 

The 12.30 metre-high structure (focal height 10 metres), a sector light beacon (Leitfeuer and Quermarkenfeuer), is located south of Neuendorf on the northern boundary of the Gellen. It has lighthouse number C2586 and the coordinates . The beacon has the official name Leuchtfeuer Gellen/Hiddensee. The white steel tower with a red gallery and conical roof stands on a base of natural stone. It was built in 1904 by the firm of Julius Pintsch AG (Berlin) from cast sections (metal tubbings (Tübbings)), was tested in 1905 and fully operational in 1907.
The Gellen/Hiddensee lighthouse marks the northern entrance of the Gellenstrom, in the west marking the channel of the  Gellenstrom itself and in the east guiding ships through the Schaproder Bodden.
The lighthouse was depicted on a 5 million mark currency note of 1923 for the county of Rügen. In the GDR postage stamp series, "Lighthouses, Sector Lights and Mole Beacons" from 1975 the Gellen Beacon is the motif decorating the 10 pfennig stamp.

In popular culture
Hiddensee is depicted in a painting of the same name by the German Expressionist, Walter Grammatté, which is currently on display in the Brücke Museum in Berlin.

Hiddensee is mentioned in Nina Hagen's song Du hast den Farbfilm vergessen ("You forgot the colour film").

"Hiddensee" is used as subtitle of a music album Songs for the Apocalypse by German one-person indie band Entertainment for the Braindead, which was mainly recorded while camping at Hiddensee. The album's artwork also features a view of Dornbusch Lighthouse.

"Hiddensee" is the title of a song by Berlin-based alternative band Skiing, featured on Mouca Records' Cartouche mix from 2013.

Hiddensee was used to depict Ireland in the external scenes of the Nazis' 1940 anti-British/pro-Irish propaganda film The Fox of Glenarvon (Der Fuchs von Glenarvon). 

German author Lutz Seiler's bestselling 2014 novel, Kruso, is set on Hiddensee at the end of the DDR period (Suhrkamp ; published in English by Scribe).

Tutti in Hans Fallada's novel Iron Gustav inherits a property on Hiddensee.

Gallery

See also
List of islands of Germany

References

External links

 Overnight on Hiddensee Island - slideshow by The New York Times

 
German islands in the Baltic
Car-free zones in Europe
Islands of Mecklenburg-Western Pomerania
Populated coastal places in Germany (Baltic Sea)